The Cathedral of St Patrick and St Joseph (usually known as St Patrick's Cathedral) is a Catholic church in Auckland CBD, situated on the corner of Federal Street and Wyndham St. It is the mother church of the Roman Catholic Diocese of Auckland and the cathedral of the Bishop of Auckland.

In 1841, the land was acquired by Bishop Jean Baptiste Pompallier, the first Catholic bishop in New Zealand. A wooden chapel was constructed in 1842, replaced by a stone church in 1848, which was expanded in 1884, and finally replaced with the current cathedral in 1907. The church was designated as a cathedral in 1848, and consecrated in 1963.

Masses
The normal Mass times are:

 Sunday: 8am, 11am, 4.30pm & 7pm; 
 Monday to Friday: 7 am & 12.15 pm; 
 Public Holidays and Saturdays: 8.30am.

Origins
The church is located on the original site granted by the Crown to Jean Baptiste Pompallier, the first bishop, on 1 June 1841. To minister to the 300 or 400, mostly Irish, Catholics in Auckland in the 1840s, a wooden chapel, clergy house and school room (the first amenity ready for use) were opened and blessed on 29 January 1843. Work soon began on a more permanent church. In 1845, the Australian architect Walter Robinson arrived in Auckland on the encouragement of Pompallier and he was commissioned to design a stone church. The new church was built on the original grant of land and situated on the corner of Chapel Street (now Federal Street) and Wyndham Street.

At first referred to as a chapel, and then a church, St Patrick's became the Catholic cathedral when Auckland was made a diocese in 1848 and when Pompallier, after a visit to France and Rome, returned to Auckland in April 1850 and made the city (then the capital of New Zealand) his headquarters. This simple, plain church, seating 700, was built of locally quarried hammered scoria and had a very substantial appearance similar to others designed by Walter Robinson at this time.

On 4 May 1884, the foundation stone of a new (24.4m by 12.2m) nave was laid, and the old stone church became the transept – the altar, for which a recess was built in 1895, being on the east wall. The architect for this major addition was Edward Mahoney. Between 1884 and 1885, the nave was extended according to Edward's scheme. The nave had a tower, and the bells for this were brought from Rome. The organ was brought from Brompton Oratory, London for £600. The new addition was opened on 15 March 1885 by Archbishop Redwood, the Archbishop of Wellington.

Current cathedral

Construction

By the turn of the century, the cathedral was once again found to be inadequate in size for the burgeoning population of Auckland. Edward Mahoney's son and architectural partner, Thomas Mahoney, drafted plans for the demolition of the stone church and its replacement with expanded transepts. In 1907, the 1848 church was demolished, with further extension of the nave (by 12.2 metres), the addition of a sanctuary, the construction of four sacristies and two side chapels, and the addition of three ample entrance porches (one constituting the baptistry). On 23 February 1908, the newly reconstructed building – the present St Patrick's Cathedral – was opened, in the presence of a capacity congregation of 1,300, by Cardinal Francis Moran, the Archbishop of Sydney.

Consecration and restoration
On 1 September 1963, St Patrick's Cathedral, free of debt and built in permanent materials, was solemnly consecrated by Archbishop James Liston.

A major restoration programme was completed in 2007. This involved a complete reordering of the interior of the cathedral including the transformation of the chancel area into a Blessed Sacrament chapel and the placing on the side altars of icon-style paintings of the Blessed Virgin Mary and the Holy Family with high altar replaced by a large raised apron containing altar, bishop's throne, rostrum and baptismal font (with water permanently flowing towards the north). Another feature in the cathedral is a silk tapestry that has hung on the west wall of the north transept since 1989.

Gallery

Connections
 A grapevine outside the cathedral is believed to have come from a vine brought to New Zealand by Bishop Pompallier.<ref name="NZCatholic">Peter Grace, "Generous benefactors' graves are restored", NZ Catholic, 20 May 2012, p. 19.</ref>
 In 1940, after a requiem Mass at Sacred Heart Basilica, Wellington, and a train journey, the body of New Zealand Prime Minister Michael Joseph Savage, who had died in office, rested in the cathedral before being interred at Bastion Point where the Savage Memorial was constructed.
 St Patrick's Cathedral (especially its spire) was the climactic location in the 1988 Vincent Ward-directed film The Navigator: A Medieval Odyssey.
 The cathedral is registered as a historic place by Heritage New Zealand.
 George Michael Lenihan OSB (1858–1910), fifth Bishop of Auckland (1896–1910), and John Mackey (1918–2014), ninth Bishop of Auckland (1974–1983), are buried in the Cathedral

Administrators
The Administrators of the Cathedral have included the following priests:

 John Baptist Petit-Jean (1842–1845)
 John Forest (1845–1850)
 Henry Fynes (1850–1852)
 James McDonald (1852–1869)
 Michael O'Hara (1869–1871)
 Walter McDonald (1871–1886)
 Patrick Costello (1887)
 Victor Thomas (1888)
 James Hackett (1889–1895)
 W J Madden (1895–1897)
 Thomas Mulvihill (1897–1898)
 Patrick O'Reilly (1899–1901)
 James Patterson (1901–1905)
 Henry Holbrook (1905–1913)
 Matthew Brodie (1913–1915)
 Jeremiah Cahill (1915–1916)
 William Murphy (1916–1918)
 John Brennan (1918–1919)
 William Forde (1919–1921)
 John Brennan (1921–1923)
 John Bradley (1924–1925)
 Leonard Buxton (1925–1942)
 Adrian Curran (1942–1970)
 Brian Arahill (1971– 1988)
 (????)
 Michael Bancroft (1998–1999)
 Bernard Kiely (1999–2017)
 Peter Tipene (2017–2021)
 Christopher Denham (2021–present) 

Notes

References

 Frances Porter (ed), Historic Buildings of New Zealand: North Island, Cassell New Zealand for the New Zealand Historic Places Trust, Dunedin, 1975.
 E.R. Simmons, A Brief History of the Catholic Church in New Zealand, Catholic Publication Centre, Auckland, 1978.
 E.R. Simmons, In Cruce Salus, A History of the Diocese of Auckland 1848 – 1980, Catholic Publication Centre, Auckland 1982.
 Earnest Simmons, The Story of St Patrick's'', Catholic Diocese of Auckland(?), Auckland, 1985.

External links 
 St Patricks Cathedral, Auckland website (Retrieved 9 September 2011)

Patrick's Cathedral
Roman Catholic cathedrals in New Zealand
Roman Catholic churches completed in 1908
Heritage New Zealand Category 1 historic places in the Auckland Region
Basilica churches in New Zealand
Listed churches in New Zealand
1900s architecture in New Zealand
1843 establishments in New Zealand
1908 establishments in New Zealand
20th-century Roman Catholic church buildings in New Zealand
Auckland CBD